The Pokok Sena District is a district and parliamentary constituency in Kedah, Malaysia. It is the 12th district of Kedah which was formerly a subdistrict of Kota Setar, about 20 km east of Alor Setar. The declaration of the 24,000ha district with a population of 50,000 was made by the Sultan of Kedah, Tuanku Abdul Halim Mu'adzam Shah in conjunction with his 81st birthday celebrations in January 2009 (also in commemorating the golden jubilee anniversary of his reign from 1958-2008). The district is divided into 6 sub-districts: Gajah Mati, Jabi, Tualang, Lesong, Bukit Lada, Derang and consists of 122 villages and 21 residential areas. The Pokok Sena district lies within the boundaries of the local government Alor Setar City Council (Majlis Bandaraya Alor Setar).

Name 
Pokok Sena is a Malay name for Angsana (Androcarpus indicus), which is a common shade tree in Kedah. This tree was once usually found along the traditional river routes before the development of roads. Now most of the trees are found along roadsides and within office compounds.

Administrative Divisions 

Pokok Sena District is divided into 6 mukims, which are:
Derang
Lesong
Tualang
Gajah Mati
Jabi
Bukit Lada

Demographics

Education 
There are a number of schools which serve the population of Pokok Sena. Pokok Sena also has a boarding school Sekolah Menengah Sains Pokok Sena or SAINA. In Pokok Sena also there is Kolej Islam Darul Ulum.

Development 
The district was poised for rapid development with ongoing infrastructure projects such as road expansion spanning from Hutan Kampung, Pokok Sena and Kuala Nerang to Sungai Burung to spur new growth areas. Pokok Sena's landscape will undergo rapid changes. Many housing projects are in the pipeline. A lot of opportunities will open up with construction projects and manufacturing facilities. The state government is currently developing a new township of this district called Bandar Baru Sejahtera Pokok Sena. Scheduled to be completed in 2017, this project costs RM230 million.

Important Places in Pokok Sena
There are a few important places near Pokok Sena, namely Taman Kekal Pengeluaran Makan (TKPM) Gajah Mati, Agriculture Station Gajah Mati and Veterinary Station Gajah Mati. Another important place in Pokok Sena is Penjara Pokok Sena (Pokok Sena Jail).

Federal Parliament and State Assembly Seats 
List of Pokok Sena district representatives in the Federal Parliament (Dewan Rakyat)

List of Pokok Sena district representatives in the State Legislative Assembly of Kedah

Transportation
Pokok Sena is linked to state capital Alor Setar by Federal Route 175. Other state routes link the town to Padang Terap, Pendang and Kubang Pasu districts.

References

Districts of Kedah